Good Vibrations – Best of The Beach Boys is the fourth official compilation album by The Beach Boys, and the first on their Brother Records imprint.  In June 1974, The Beach Boys' old label, Capitol Records, released a double-album compilation of the band's 1962–1965 hits titled Endless Summer, to capitalize on their popularity as a regular touring act. After the unofficial release became an unexpected commercial success, a follow-up, Spirit of America, was rushed out by Capitol in the spring of 1975 and was almost as successful.  Wishing to capitalize on this commercial resurgence with an official release, on Brother Records, The Beach Boys opportunistically issued Good Vibrations – Best of The Beach Boys.

The band had temporarily received the licensing rights to all their Capitol albums from Pet Sounds onwards, and was exclusively able to use post-1965 material, including their contemporary works, to create a more diverse collection. Released in June 1975, Good Vibrations – Best of The Beach Boys peaked at number 25 in the US. The two Capitol compilations proved more attractive to shoppers, however, and far outsold this collection.

Track listing

Good Vibrations – The Very Best of The Beach Boys (Brother/Reprise MS 2223) hit number 25 in the US during a 23-week chart stay.

Sources
 "The Nearest Faraway Place: Brian Wilson, The Beach Boys and the Southern California Experience", Timothy White, c. 1994.
 "Top Pop Singles 1955–2001", Joel Whitburn, c. 2002.
 "Top Pop Albums 1955–2001", Joel Whitburn, c. 2002.

References

1975 greatest hits albums
The Beach Boys compilation albums
Reprise Records compilation albums